Amdal is a small farming village in Sauda municipality in Rogaland county, Norway.

References

External links 
 Sauda statistics

Sauda
Villages in Rogaland